The Legion of Death is a 1918 American drama film directed by Tod Browning, and released by Metro Pictures Corporation.

Plot
As described in a film magazine, determined to lay down her life if necessary for her country, Princess Marya (Storey) mobilizes an army of Russian peasant women and is stationed in one of the front line trenches. German forces are about to overrun her battery when American volunteers arrive, and the Germans are dispelled. With autocracy abolished in Russia, Marya consents to become the wife of American Captain Rodney Willard (McCullough).

Cast
 Edith Storey as Princess Marya
 Philo McCullough as Captain Rodney Willard
 Fred Malatesta as Grand Duke Paul
 Charles K. Gerrard as Grand Duke Orlof
 Pomeroy Cannon as Dmitri
 Norma Nichols as Draya
 R.O. Pennell as Czar
 Grace Aide as Czarina
 H.L. Swisher as Kerensky
 Francis Marion as Czarevitch
 Harry Moody as Makar
 Irene Aldwyn
 Junior Beckner

Reception
Like many American films of the time, The Legion of Death was subject to cuts by city and state film censorship boards. For example, the Chicago Board of Censors initially issued a set of required cuts in early March 1918, but the distributor requested a rehearing by the Board. On further review, the Board reduced the cuts to the following: in Reel 1, the slugging of a man, Reel 2, two struggle scenes between German officer and young woman, striking her mother on head, five scenes of officer leering at young woman, tearing gown from young woman's shoulders, all visions scenes of young woman after the intertitle "And when the raiders left", and, Reel 7, the struggle scene between Marya and Orlof where he opens her waist.

References

External links

1918 films
American silent feature films
American black-and-white films
1918 drama films
Films directed by Tod Browning
Silent American drama films
1910s American films